The 1982 RAC Tricentrol British Saloon Car Championship was the 25th season of the championship. The championship was open to saloon cars complying with FIA Appendix J Group 1 regulations. Win Percy won his third consecutive title, this time driving a class C Toyota Corolla. In doing so, he became the fourth driver to win three BSCC championships.

Teams and drivers